Gustav Hoyer is an American pianist, composer, and conductor whose genres have been generally classified as classical and orchestral music. His compositions on Masters of the New Era: Volume 2, won 1st place for Best Classical Orchestral Album by Just Plain Folks in 2006 as well as being nominated for Best Classical Contemporary Album for his album, From Darkness Into Light in 2008.

Career
Hoyer began composing classical music in high school and cites Mozart as a major influence. His music has been featured in such films as Grey Focus and A Night at the Silent Movie Theater as well as being performed by The Budapest Film Orchestra, among others.  He is the founder and director of the Los Angeles-based, Orchestra Unleashed, which features a series of multimedia orchestral performances.

Albums
 2020 - The Gilded Age
 2018 - Witness
 2012 - A Soul Alone Before God
 2007 - Darkness into Light

References

20th-century American conductors (music)
21st-century American conductors (music)
20th-century classical composers
American classical pianists
Male classical pianists
American male pianists
American male classical composers
American classical composers
American male conductors (music)
Year of birth missing (living people)
Living people